The 2021-22 Hazfi Cup is the 35th season of the Iranian football knockout competition. Nassaji Mazandaran won the competition after deafiting Aluminium Arak in the final.

Participating teams
A total of 96 teams are eligible participate in the 2021–22 Hazfi Cup
. The teams were divided into four main groups.

16 teams of the Persian Gulf Pro League: (entering from Round of 32)

 All of the 16 teams were obliged to participate.

18 teams of Azadegan League:  (entering from Third Round)

28 teams of 2nd Division:  (entering from Second Round)

11 teams (from maximum 28 possible) were registered to participate.

34 teams of Provincial Leagues: (Kish, Khoramshahr and Tehran can have extra Representatives.) (entering from First Round)

 28 teams (from maximum 34 possible) were registered to participate.

Schedule
The schedule of the competition is as follows.

First stage

First round

Second round

Third round

Second stage

Bracket

Fourth Round (round of 32) 
The 16 teams from Iran Pro League entered the competition from the second stage.

Fifth Round (round of 16)

Sixth Round (quarter-finals)

Seventh Round (semi-finals)

Eighth Round (final)

Statistics

See also 
 Iran Pro League 2021–22
 Azadegan League 2021–22
 Iran Football's 2nd Division 2021-22
 Iran Football's 3rd Division 2021–22
 Iranian Super Cup

Notes

References

Hazfi Cup seasons
Hazfi Cup
Hazfi Cup
2021–22 Hazfi Cup